Knowledge of Muisca mythology has come from Muisca scholars Javier Ocampo López, Pedro Simón, Lucas Fernández de Piedrahita, Juan de Castellanos and conquistador Gonzalo Jiménez de Quesada who was the European making first contact with the Muisca in the 1530s.

Muisca mythology 
The times before the Spanish conquest of the Muisca Confederation are filled with mythology. The first confirmed human rulers of the two capitals Hunza and Bacatá are said to have descended from mythical creatures. Apart from that other Muisca myths exist, such as the legendary El Dorado and the Monster of Lake Tota.

Mythological creatures 
Several mythological creatures have been described by the chroniclers:
 Thomagata, said to have been one of the most religious of the zaques, after Idacansás
 Idacansás, allegedly a mythical priest from Sugamuxi who was able to change the order of things
 Goranchacha, a mythical cacique who moved the capital of the northern Muisca from Ramiriquí to the later capital Hunza
 Pacanchique, according to Muisca myths recovered his fiancé Azay from ruler Quemuenchatocha by first turning her into a dead person and then bringing her back to life using different plants. He also showed the Spanish conquistadores the way to Nemequene's palace Other Muisca people where human and mythological character converge are:
 Hunzahúa, first zaque of Hunza, allegedly committing incest with his sister and said to have fled
 Meicuchuca, first zipa of Bacatá, one of his wives mythologically turned into a snake

Other Muisca myths 
 El Dorado, the man or city made of gold, that was not so mythical but a main motive for the Spanish to conquer Colombia. The ritual is represented in the Muisca raft, a piece of gold working found in Pasca almost 400 years after the arrival of the Spanish
 Monster of Lake Tota, allegedly a monstrous snake or fish living in Lake Tota
 Hunzahúa Well, a well that according to the mythology of the Muisca originated from spilled chicha when the mother of Hunzahúa caught him and his older sister, Noncetá, while they were copulating.

 Fura and Tena, the first woman and man created by the god Are to populate the earth. Because Fura was not faithful, they lost their immortality, so they aged and died. Are took pity on them and turned them into rocky crags protected from storms, and Fura's tears became into emeralds.

See also 

Muisca women
Aztec mythology
Inca 
Maya mythology
Muisca religion

References

Bibliography